Fath-Ali Khan Saheb Divan (1821 – 21 June 1858) was an Iranian treasurer who served as the sahib divan of the court of Naser al-Din Shah.

Saheb Divan was the eldest son of Ali Akbar Qawam al-Mulk from the Qavam family. his father named him in honour of Fath-Ali Shah, the king of Iran.

He entered the government work in 1840, when his father appointed him as the treasurer of Fars, he also arranged a marriage between Fath-Ali and Aziz ol-Dowleh, the daughter of Mohammad Shah. Fath-Ali worked in the treasury for eight years.

In 1848, Naser al-Din Shah bestowed him the title of sahib divan and made him the treasurer of his court. he gradually grew in the court and even became the minister of Mozaffar ad-Din Mirza at some point. his progress however was worrisome for Mirza Aqa Khan Nuri, thus on his behest, on 21 June 1858, a group of outlaws murdered Fath-Ali Khan on his way to the king's palace.

References 
1821 births
1858 deaths
19th-century Iranian politicians

Iranian people of Jewish descent
Qavam family
Qajar courtiers